Jyeshtha or Jyēṣṭha (jēṭ;  zeth;  Jyeṣṭha) is a month of the Hindu calendar. In India's national civil calendar, Jyestha is the third month of the year. Known as Joishtho ( Jyôishţhô) in Bengali, it is the second month of the Bengali calendar.

In lunar religious calendars, Jyēṣṭha begins on the new moon and is the third month of the year.

Traditionally, Jyēṣṭha is associated with high summer, and corresponds to May–June in the Gregorian calendar. In Tamil, the month is known as Aani, the third month of the solar calendar that begins in mid-June.

In Vedic Jyotish, Jyēṣṭha begins with the Sun's entry into Taurus, and is the second month of the year. In the Vaishnava calendar.

Festivals
 Shani Dev Jayanti is celebrated on New Moon day i.e. Amavasya of Jyeshtha month.
 Ganga Dussehra is celebrated as the avatarana or descent of the Ganges from heaven to earth. The day of the celebration, Ganga Dashahara, the Dashami (tenth day) of the waxing moon of the Hindu calendar month Jyestha, brings throngs of bathers to the banks of the river. A soak in the Ganges on this day is said to rid the bather of ten sins (dasha = Sanskrit "ten"; hara = to destroy) or alternatively, ten lifetimes of sins.
 Nirjala Ekadashi is celebrated on Shukla Paksha (waxing moon) Ekadashi (11th day) of Jyeshtha. It is the most sacred and auspicious Ekadashis among all 24 Ekadashis in a year. One can attain the benefits of all 24 Ekadashis by fasting on this day.
 Vat Purnima is a celebration observed in Maharashtra and Karnataka, India. It is celebrated on the full moon day (the 15th) of the month of Jyeshtha on the Hindu Calendar, which falls in June on the Gregorian Calendar. Women pray for their husbands by tying threads around a banyan tree on this day. It honors Savitri, the legendary wife of Satyavan who escaped death for her husband's life.
 Snana Yatra is a bathing festival celebrated on the Purnima (full moon day) of the Hindu month of Jyeshtha. It is an important festival of the Jagannath Cult. The deities Jagannath, Balabhadra, Subhadra, Sudarshan, and Madanmohan are brought out from the Jagannath Temple (Puri) and taken in a procession to the Snana Bedi. They are ceremonially bathed and decorated for a public audience.
 Sitalsasthi Carnival is being conducted in this month on the day of Jyeshtha Shuddha Shashthi in Odisha for many centuries.

See also

 Astronomical basis of the Hindu calendar
Hindu units of time
 Indian astronomy
 Hindu astrology

References

03